Worlds Away may refer to:

Worlds Away (Pablo Cruise album) (1978)
Worlds Away (Strange Advance album) (1982)
Worlds Away (Crumbächer-Duke album) (1990)
Worlds Away (Ian Moss album) (1991)
Worlds Away (John Norum album) (1996)
"Worlds Away" (From First to Last song) (2008)
Cirque du Soleil: Worlds Away, a 2012 film

See also
WorldsAway, an online virtual world